The Arab Mountain Fire Observation Station is a historic fire observation station located on Mount Arab at Piercefield in St. Lawrence County, New York. The tower is a prefabricated structure built by the Aermotor Corporation and provided a front line of defense in preserving the Adirondack Forest Preserve from the hazards of forest fires.

It was listed on the National Register of Historic Places in 2001.

References

External links
The Fire Towers of New York

Government buildings on the National Register of Historic Places in New York (state)
Government buildings completed in 1918
Towers completed in 1918
Buildings and structures in St. Lawrence County, New York
Fire lookout towers in Adirondack Park
Fire lookout towers on the National Register of Historic Places in New York (state)
National Register of Historic Places in St. Lawrence County, New York
1918 establishments in New York (state)